Count of Salvatierra is a hereditary title in the Peerage of Spain, accompanied by the dignity of Grandee and granted in 1613 by Philip III to Diego Sarmiento de Sotomayor, Lord of Salvaterra and of the Castle of Sobroso.

The title makes reference to the town of Salvaterra de Miño, in the Province of Pontevedra.

Counts of Salvatierra (1613)

Diego Sarmiento de Sotomayor y Mendoza, 1st Count of Salvatierra
García Sarmiento de Sotomayor y Luna, 2nd Count of Salvatierra
Diego Sarmiento de Sotomayor y Luna, 3rd Count of Salvatierra
José Salvador Sarmiento de Sotomayor e Isasi, 4th Count of Salvatierra
José Francisco Sarmiento de Sotomayor y Velasco, 5th Count of Salvatierra
Ana Sarmiento de Sotomayor y Córdoba, 6th Countess of Salvatierra
José María Fernández de Córdoba y Sarmiento de Sotomayor, 7th Count of Salvatierra
Juana Nepomucena Fernández de Córdoba y Villaroel, 8th Countess of Salvatierra
Agustín de Silva y Bernuy, 9th Count of Salvatierra
Andrés Avelino de Silva y Fernández de Córdoba, 10th Count of Salvatierra
Alfonso de Silva y Campbell, 11th Count of Salvatierra
Alfonso de Silva y Fernández de Córdoba, 12th Count of Salvatierra
Cayetana Fitz-James Stuart y Silva, 13th Countess of Salvatierra
Cayetano Martínez de Irujo y Fitz-James Stuart, 14th Count of Salvatierra

See also
Duke of Arjona
List of current Grandees of Spain

References 

Grandees of Spain
Lists of counts
Lists of Spanish nobility